OAP may refer to: 
OAP Tower, or Osaka Amenity Park Tower, a plaza and office development in Japan
Old-age pensioner, a person who has retired, and now collects a pension
One Australia policy, a proposal in the 1980s to limit Asian immigration to Australia
Open access (publishing), a type of academic publication accessible by all, without subscription
 Offset Alpine Printing
 Off-axis parabolic reflector, a type of curved mirror used in optics and radio
 the Office of Atoms for Peace of Thailand